Kelli Valade (born October 11, 1969), is an American businesswoman who was formerly the chief executive officer of Red Lobster. Previously she was CEO and president of Black Box Intelligence (formerly TDn2K)  (Transforming Data into Knowledge). She is the former brand president of Chili's Grill & Bar and former executive vice president at Brinker International. Prior to that, she held many executive positions in operations as COO and in human resources.

Early life 
Valade was adopted at birth, raised in an Italian family and spent her Sundays cooking meatballs and sauce with her grandmother. She grew up playing softball and basketball in New York state and had her first job as a hostess at TJ's Big Boy when she was 16 years old. From there, her love for the restaurant industry was born.

Education 
Valade received her Bachelor of Science in sociology from Binghamton University where she ran an Italian restaurant while studying. She received her MBA from Syracuse University.

Early career 
Valade started her career in restaurants and hospitality in 1993 when she worked as an intern at American Services Management Resources, now known as TDn2K. From there, she moved to Carlson Restaurants Worldwide where she was a manager of training and recruiting for Friday's Front Row Italiano, part of T.G.I. Fridays. In 1996, she joined Brinker International as the director of On the Border Mexican Grill & Cantina.

Tenure at Brinker 
In November 1996, Valade was hired to Brinker International as the director for On the Border Mexican Grill & Cantina. From there, she held a number of senior and executive positions that included:

1997 - 2000: director, human resources, Brinker International
2000 - 2002: senior director, corporate human resources and diversity & inclusion, Brinker International
2002 - 2003: vice president, human resources
2003 - 2004: vice president, emerging brands
2004 - 2005: vice president, compensation & compliance
2005 - 2007: vice president, people & performance
2007 - 2009: senior vice president, PeopleWorks, Chili's Grill & Bar
2010 - 2016: chief operating officer, Chili's Grill & Bar
2016 - 2018: president, Chili's Grill & Bar and executive vice president, Brinker International

As Brinker's president, she created the brand strategy and direction and oversaw all executive leadership functions for 1,600 restaurants, 75,000 staff and $3 billion in annual revenues. Additionally, she grew average annual restaurant volumes from $2.8 million to $3.1 million in 18 months and introduced a "3 for $10" value menu platform, leveraging Chili's core equities, driving immediate and sustaining traffic improvement of 8%.

During her time as Chili's COO, Valade implemented the "Best Life" wellbeing platform with programs tied to improving team members’ career, social, financial, community and physical wellbeing, achieving all-time high team engagement scores.

Non-profit 
Valade is on the board of directors of the Women's Foodservice Forum, an organization that is accelerating the advancement of women leaders. Additionally, she is on the board of Shelton School, an organization focused on improving the education of individuals with learning differences.

Awards and memberships 
 Board of directors: Women's Foodservice Forum 
 On the Top 50 Power List presented by Nation’s Restaurant News
 Board member: National Restaurant Association, 2013 - 2015 
 Previous board member for the Multicultural Foodservice and Hospitality Alliance
 Won the Beacon Award from The Western Foodservice and Hospitality Expo
 Won the 2012 Women in Business Award presented by the Dallas Business Journal 
 Was named a Women Worth Watching by the Diversity Journal in 2010

Personal life 
Valade has been married to her husband, Don Valade, since 1998. They reside in Dallas with their children, Morgan and Christian.

References

External links 
 www.tdn2k.com TDn2K

1969 births
Living people
American women chief executives
Binghamton University alumni
American women business executives
Syracuse University alumni
21st-century American women